Ronald Brown (20 March 1923 – 1968), sometimes known as Paddy Brown, was a Northern Irish professional footballer who played as a centre forward in the Football League for Hull City.

Personal life 
Brown served in the Royal Navy during the Second World War.

Career statistics

References 

Brentford F.C. players
English Football League players
1923 births
1968 deaths
Association footballers from Northern Ireland
Association football forwards
People from Ballymoney
Linfield F.C. players
Plymouth Argyle F.C. players
Hull City A.F.C. players
Blackburn Rovers F.C. players
Royal Navy personnel of World War II